Qua'an Pan is a Local Government Area in Plateau State, Nigeria. Its headquarters are in the town of Baap (or Ba'ap).

It has an area of 2,478 km² and a population of 196,929 at the 2006 census. It is the fifth largest Local Government in the state based on Population.

The postal code of the area is 934.

History 
Qua'an Pan Local Government was carved out of Shendam Local Government on 3 May 1989, by the Ibrahim Babangida regime. Qua'an Pan has two major tribes, the Pan and the Goemai.

The Pan people of Qua’an Pan are descended from Daffiar who migrated from parts unknown to present day Qua’an Pan. In the course of Daffiar’s migration, he eventually settled atop a hill in present day Koffiar. His offspring decided to continue the migration in search of arable lands on the plains below the hill. They settled in various areas including present day Doka and Kwa. In the course of the migration, one of the Daffier’s children got tired at a certain location and declared "Dum mak", which means, "the journey is enough" in the local dialect. This formed the basis of the name of present day Doemak. Daffiar also had a pair of twins who continued migrating and eventually settled in present day Namu. This is why Namu is known as Jep Jan, which means twins in the local dialect.

Geography 
Qua'an Pan is located in the Southern region of Plateau state. The Local Government is bordered to the North by Bokkos, Mangu and Pankshin Local Governments. To the East by Shendam Local Government and to the West and South by Nassarawa State.

Governance 
Qua'an Pan has eight districts, namely: Bwall, Doemak, Dokan Kasuwa (Jagatnoeng), Kwa, Kwalla (Kwagallak), Kwande (Moekwo), Kwang and Namu (Jepjan). The LG headquarters is at Ba'ap. The LGA is under the Plateau South Senatorial District and Mikang/Qua'an Pan/Shendam Federal Constituency. At the state level, it is divided into Qua'an Pan North and Qua'an Pan South State Constituencies.

Political structure 
Qua'an Pan has 166 polling units, and 20 electoral wards consisting of 11 federal and 9 state wards. The electoral wards are: Doemak-Geochim, Doemak-Koplong, Dokan Kasuwa, Kwa, Kwang, Bwall, Kurgwi, Kwalla Moeda, Kwalla Yitla’ar, Kwagar, Latok, Lankaku/Kwari, Lardang, Luukwo, Njak-Shindai, Dokan Kasuwa West, Janta-Aningo, Kurgwi West and Namu.

Leadership 
The past chairpersons of Qua'an Pan Local Government are presented in the table below:

Traditional institutions 
The tradition council of Qua'an Pan is chaired by the President of the Qua'an Pan Traditional Council. The President of the council is whoever holds the title of the Long Pan, who serves as paramount ruler of the Pan people. The Long Pan is a First Class chief and the chief custodian of the Pan culture. The Long Pan is selected from any of the district heads of the 8 Qua'an Pan Districts by voting between the district heads. The newly elected Long Pan is HRH Emmanuel Dabang, who was the district head of Dokan Kasuwa before his election. The other district heads are listed below:

Culture 
There are two major tribes in Qua'an Pan which are the Pan and the Goemai. Various dialects are spoken in the area which include Mernyang, Doemak, Bwall, Jagatnoeng, Kwagallak and Goemai. Other minor dialects include the Nteng, Garam and the Njak. Qua'an also celebrates numerous cultural days and festivals. These include: Pantong, Waptoer, Shikam, Doemak Day and Pan Cultural Day.

Tourism 
The Pandam Game Reserve is located in Namu, Qua'an Pan. The tourist attraction has a diverse collection of exotic animals and plants. There is also the famous Lardang cave located in Kwa. The Latok waterfalls in Doemak that slowly runs all year round. Natures beauty is also expressed in the form of the range of sloping hills bordering the northern part of Qua'an Pan.

Occupation 
The people of Qua'an Pan are predominantly farmers and also engage in other trades like, blacksmithing, metal works, hunting, trading and fishing.

Economic activity 
The main crops cultivated in commercial quantity include Yam, Cassava, Rice, Groundnuts, Guinea Corn, Beans, Palm Oil, Shea Butter, Groundnut, Bambarram nut and Olive Oil. Qua'an Pan has numerous large markets which operate on market days which vary between districts.

References

Local Government Areas in Plateau State